Devils Lake State Recreation Area (also Devils Lake State Park) is a state park in the U.S. state of Oregon, administered by the Oregon Parks and Recreation Department.

It is the only coastal Oregon State park with a campground located in a city.  The campground area is located at the southwest shore of Devils Lake in Lincoln City, and the day use area is on the south shore.  The park provides kayaks for those participating in summer guided kayak wildlife tours.

Activities include camping (RV, tent, yurt, and biker), boat, water skiing, swimming, and personal watercraft.

See also
 D River State Recreation Site, a state park beach within walking distance
 List of Oregon state parks

References

External links
 

State parks of Oregon
Parks in Lincoln County, Oregon